Ernst Wilhelm (William) Olson (16 March 1870 – 6 October 1958) was a Swedish-American journalist, publicist, writer, and translator. He has been described as "one of Swedish-America's foremost literary figures".

Biography 
Olson was born to Johannes Olson and Johanna Gran in Mjölkalånga, Finja, Scania, Sweden. Olson emigrated with his parents, four brothers, and five sisters to the United States in 1878. He grew up in Swedeburg, Nebraska, and attended Luther Academy in Wahoo, Nebraska, and Augustana College in Rock Island, Illinois. He received his master's degree from Bethany College and doctorate in philosophy from Augustana College.

He worked for a time as editor-in-chief of Nya Pressen, and journalist and editor-in-chief of Fosterlandet in Chicago from 1896 to 1900 and Svenska Tribunen from 1900 to 1905, after which he went into publishing. He was publishing editor of Engberg-Holmberg from 1906 to 1911. From 1911 Olson was publishing editor of the Swedish-American firm Augustana Book Concern. He was editor of Ungdomsvännen from 1914 to 1918. In 1917, the monthly published a poem by Carl Lönnquist critical of American involvement in World War I, causing an uproar. Olson attempted to calm the readers by speaking of the balance between complying with the government and being allowed to criticize it. He also argued that immigrants were more likely to be patriotic, in contrast to prevailing views seeing them as disloyal. However, Olson was unsuccessful and in the end was forced to leave his position.

His writings include A History of the Swedes of Illinois (three volumes, 1908), The Swedish Element in Illinois (1917), Reformation cantata (1917), Pilgrims of the prairie (1929) and contributions to Svenskarna i Amerika (1925). Selected Poems. (1947). Olson also wrote children's literature.

Olson wrote and translated a number of hymns, including translating "The Sign of the Cross I Triumphantly Bear" ("", lyrics by Carl Olof Rosenius), "Children of the Heavenly Father" ("", lyrics by Lina Sandell), and "All Hail to Thee, O Blessed Morn!" ("", lyrics by Johan Olof Wallin) to English. He made important contributions to the Augustana Lutheran Church's hymnal, The Hymnal, and served on the committee to produce the Lutheran Service Book and Hymnal.

He married Anna Elizabeth Strand in 1899. After her death in 1924, he married Johanna Magnusson-Stock in 1930; she died in 1937. He married for a third time in 1940, to Hanna Morris Brown. Olson died in Chicago in 1958.

Awards 
 Honorary master's degree – Bethany College (1899)
 Doctor of Humane Letters – Augustana College (1926)
 Knight of the Order of Vasa (1948)

Bibliography 

 
  (Two volumes)
 
 
 
  (with music)

References

Notes

Sources 
 

1870 births
1958 deaths
Swedish journalists
Swedish writers
Knights of the Order of Vasa